Thomas Doughty DD (1636 – 2 December 1701) was a Canon of Windsor from 1673 to 1701.

Career

He was educated at Queen Elizabeth Grammar School, Wakefield and Magdalene College, Cambridge where he graduated BA in 1657, MA in 1660, DD in 1671.

He was appointed:
Chaplain to the Duke of York
Vicar of Romsey, Hampshire 1662
Rector of Bishopstoke 1666–1698
Rector of Clewer, Berkshire 1680

He was appointed to the seventh stall in St George's Chapel, Windsor Castle in 1673 and held the canonry until 1701.

Notes 

1636 births
1701 deaths
Canons of Windsor
Alumni of Magdalene College, Cambridge
People educated at Queen Elizabeth Grammar School, Wakefield